The Bugdainskoe mine is a large molybdenum mine located in the south of Russia in Alexandrovo-Zavodsky District, Zabaykalsky Krai. Bugdainskoe represents one of the largest molybdenum reserve in Russia and in the world having estimated reserves of 813 million tonnes of ore grading 0.08% molybdenum, 0.35million oz of gold and 6.2 million oz of silver.

References 

Molybdenum mines in Russia
Zabaykalsky Krai
Buildings and structures in Zabaykalsky Krai